Club Mercedes is an Argentine sports club located in the city of Mercedes in Buenos Aires Province. Having been established in 1875, the club is regarded as the oldest association football club still in existence in Argentina.

The football team will play in Primera D, one of two leagues that form the fifth division of the Argentine football league system since the 2022 season. Until then, it had played in Torneo Federal C, a now defunct regionalised 5° division, where Mercedes participated in the 2017 season.

At regional level, Mercedes also played in the "Liga Mercedina", the league where clubs from Mercedes and other cities around (such as San Antonio de Areco, Luján or Zárate among others) participate.

Apart from football, other sports practised at the club are basketball, roller skating, swimming and tennis.

History 
Club Mercedes was founded by Dr. Manuel Lanchenhein under the name "Club Social". It was the institution chosen by the traditional families of Mercedes, who used to attend the conferences, banquets and dances held by the club.

In 1935, the Club Social merged with Club Deportivo, forming current "Club Mercedes"

The football team is the most winning of Liga Mercedina, with 19 championships won. The club has also played the Torneo Argentino C and Torneo Argentino B several times. In 2012, Mercedes debuted in Copa Argentina but the team was eliminated in the first stage.

In 2016 Mercedes debuted in the Torneo Federal C, the regionalised 5th level of Argentine football system (and lowest division) that had a total of 266 teams that season. Mercedes placed 4th of 4 in the Zona 22 being eliminated in the first round.

In April 2022, it was announced that Mercedes's request for affiliation to the Argentine Football Association (AFA) had been accepted therefore the team will play in Primera D Metropolitana since the 2022 season. The last club to be affiliated to AFA prior to Mercedes had been Real Pilar in 2017. It was announced that only under-23 players would be allowed to play for the senior squad.

Titles

Regional 
 Liga Mercedina (18): 1981, 1984, 1985, 1986, 1987, 1988, 1989, 1990, 1991, 1992, 1993, 1996, 1997, 2000 2001, 2002, 2004, 2005
 Torneo Provincial (1): 1993

References

External links 
 
 

M
M
M